Sainath is both a given name and a surname. Notable people with the name include:

Palagummi Sainath (born 1957), Indian photojournalist
Sainath Thotapalli (born 1956), Indian writer in Tollywood

Surnames of Indian origin